Zographetus dzonguensis, the chocolate-bordered flitter, is a butterfly belonging to the family Hesperiidae. Z. dzonguensis was named after the area it was found in (Dzongu).

Distribution
Species was described from Upper Dzongu, North Sikkim District, Sikkim, India.

References

Hesperiinae
Butterflies of Asia
Butterflies described in 2021